Network throughput (or just throughput, when in context) refers to the rate of message delivery over a communication channel, such as Ethernet or packet radio, in a communication network. The data that these messages contain may be delivered over physical or logical links, or through network nodes. Throughput is usually measured in bits per second (bit/s or bps), and sometimes in data packets per second (p/s or pps) or data packets per time slot.

The system throughput or aggregate throughput is the sum of the data rates that are delivered to all terminals in a network. Throughput is essentially synonymous to digital bandwidth consumption; it can be determined numerically by applying the queueing theory, where the load in packets per time unit is denoted as the arrival rate, and the drop in packets per unit time is denoted as the departure rate.

The throughput of a communication system may be affected by various factors, including the limitations of the underlying analog physical medium, available processing power of the system components, end-user behavior, etc. When taking various protocol overheads into account, the useful rate of the data transfer can be significantly lower than the maximum achievable throughput; the useful part is usually referred to as goodput.

Maximum throughput

Users of telecommunications devices, systems designers, and researchers into communication theory are often interested in knowing the expected performance of a system. From a user perspective, this is often phrased as either "which device will get my data there most effectively for my needs?", or "which device will deliver the most data per unit cost?". Systems designers are often interested in selecting the most effective architecture or design constraints for a system, which drive its final performance. In most cases, the benchmark of what a system is capable of, or its "maximum performance" is what the user or designer is interested in. The term maximum throughput is frequently used when discussing end-user maximum throughput tests.  

Maximum throughput is essentially synonymous to digital bandwidth capacity.

Four different values are relevant in the context of "maximum throughput", used in comparing the 'upper limit' conceptual performance of multiple systems. They are 'maximum theoretical throughput', 'maximum achievable throughput', and 'peak measured throughput' and 'maximum sustained throughput'. These values represent different quantities, and care must be taken that the same definitions are used when comparing different 'maximum throughput' values. Each bit must carry the same amount of information if throughput values are to be compared. Data compression can significantly alter throughput calculations, including generating values exceeding 100% in some cases. If the communication is mediated by several links in series with different bit rates, the maximum throughput of the overall link is lower than or equal to the lowest bit rate. The lowest value link in the series is referred to as the bottleneck.

Maximum theoretical throughput
This number is closely related to the channel capacity of the system, and is the maximum possible quantity of data that can be transmitted under ideal circumstances. In some cases this number is reported as equal to the channel capacity, though this can be deceptive, as only non-packetized systems (asynchronous) technologies can achieve this without data compression. Maximum theoretical throughput is more accurately reported taking into account format and specification overhead with best case assumptions. This number, like the closely related term 'maximum achievable throughput' below, is primarily used as a rough calculated value, such as for determining bounds on possible performance early in a system design phase.

Asymptotic throughput
The asymptotic throughput (less formal asymptotic bandwidth) for a packet-mode communication network is the value of the maximum throughput function, when the incoming network load approaches infinity, either due to a message size as it approaches infinity, or the number of data sources is very large. As other bit rates and data bandwidths, the asymptotic throughput is measured in bits per second (bit/s), very seldom bytes per second (B/s), where 1 B/s is 8 bit/s. Decimal prefixes are used, meaning that 1 Mbit/s is 1000000 bit/s.

Asymptotic throughput is usually estimated by sending or simulating a very large message (sequence of data packets) through the network, using a greedy source and no flow control mechanism (i.e., UDP rather than TCP), and measuring the network path throughput in the destination node. Traffic load between other sources may reduce this maximum network path throughput. Alternatively, a large number of sources and sinks may be modeled, with or without flow control, and the aggregate maximum network throughput measured (the sum of traffic reaching its destinations). In a network simulation model with infinite packet queues, the asymptotic throughput occurs when the latency (the packet queuing time) goes to infinity, while if the packet queues are limited, or the network is a multi-drop network with many sources, and collisions may occur, the packet-dropping rate approaches 100%.

A well known application of asymptotic throughput is in modeling point-to-point communication where (following Hockney) message latency T(N) is modeled as a function of message length N as T(N) = (M + N)/A where A is the asymptotic bandwidth and M is the half-peak length.

As well as its use in general network modeling, asymptotic throughput is used in modeling performance on massively parallel computer systems, where system operation is highly dependent on communication overhead, as well as processor performance. In these applications, asymptotic throughput is used in Xu and Hwang model (more general than Hockney's approach) which includes the number of processors, so that both the latency and the asymptotic throughput are functions of the number of processors.

Peak measured throughput
The above values are theoretical or calculated. Peak measured throughput is throughput measured by a real, implemented system, or a simulated system. The value is the throughput measured over a short period of time; mathematically, this is the limit taken with respect to throughput as time approaches zero. This term is synonymous with instantaneous throughput. This number is useful for systems that rely on burst data transmission; however, for systems with a high duty cycle, this is less likely to be a useful measure of system performance.

Maximum sustained throughput
This value is the throughput averaged or integrated over a long time (sometimes considered infinity). For high duty cycle networks, this is likely to be the most accurate indicator of system performance. The maximum throughput is defined as the asymptotic throughput when the load (the amount of incoming data) is very large. In packet switched systems where the load and the throughput always are equal (where packet loss does not occur), the maximum throughput may be defined as the minimum load in bit/s that causes the delivery time (the latency) to become unstable and increase towards infinity. This value can also be used deceptively in relation to peak measured throughput to conceal packet shaping.

Channel utilization and efficiency
Throughput is sometimes normalized and measured in percentage, but normalization may cause confusion regarding what the percentage is related to. Channel utilization, channel efficiency and packet drop rate in percentage are less ambiguous terms.

The channel efficiency, also known as bandwidth utilization efficiency, is the percentage of the net bit rate (in bit/s) of a digital communication channel that goes to the actually achieved throughput. For example, if the throughput is 70 Mbit/s in a 100 Mbit/s Ethernet connection, the channel efficiency is 70%. In this example, effective 70 Mbit of data are transmitted every second.

Channel utilization is instead a term related to the use of the channel, disregarding the throughput. It counts not only with the data bits, but also with the overhead that makes use of the channel. The transmission overhead consists of preamble sequences, frame headers and acknowledge packets. The definitions assume a noiseless channel. Otherwise, the throughput would not be only associated with the nature (efficiency) of the protocol, but also to retransmissions resultant from the quality of the channel. In a simplistic approach, channel efficiency can be equal to channel utilization assuming that acknowledge packets are zero-length and that the communications provider will not see any bandwidth relative to retransmissions or headers. Therefore, certain texts mark a difference between channel utilization and protocol efficiency.

In a point-to-point or point-to-multipoint communication link, where only one terminal is transmitting, the maximum throughput is often equivalent to or very near the physical data rate (the channel capacity), since the channel utilization can be almost 100% in such a network, except for a small inter-frame gap.

For example, the maximum frame size in Ethernet is 1526 bytes: up to 1500 bytes for the payload, eight bytes for the preamble, 14 bytes for the header, and 4 bytes for the trailer. An additional minimum interframe gap corresponding to 12 bytes is inserted after each frame. This corresponds to a maximum channel utilization of 1526 / (1526 + 12) × 100% = 99.22%, or a maximum channel use of 99.22 Mbit/s inclusive of Ethernet datalink layer protocol overhead in a 100 Mbit/s Ethernet connection. The maximum throughput or channel efficiency is then 1500 / (1526 + 12) = 97.5%, exclusive of the Ethernet protocol overhead.

Factors affecting throughput
The throughput of a communication system will be limited by a huge number of factors. Some of these are described below:

Analog limitations
The maximum achievable throughput (the channel capacity) is affected by the bandwidth in hertz and signal-to-noise ratio of the analog physical medium.

Despite the conceptual simplicity of digital information, all electrical signals traveling over wires are analog. The analog limitations of wires or wireless systems inevitably provide an upper bound on the amount of information that can be sent. The dominant equation here is the Shannon-Hartley theorem, and analog limitations of this type can be understood as factors that affect either the analog bandwidth of a signal or as factors that affect the signal-to-noise ratio. The bandwidth of wired systems can be in fact surprisingly narrow, with the bandwidth of Ethernet wire limited to approximately 1 GHz, and PCB traces limited by a similar amount.

Digital systems refer to the 'knee frequency', the amount of time for the digital voltage to rise from 10% of a nominal digital '0' to a nominal digital '1' or vice versa. The knee frequency is related to the required bandwidth of a channel, and can be related to the 3 db bandwidth of a system by the equation: 
Where Tr is the 10% to 90% rise time, and K is a constant of proportionality related to the pulse shape, equal to 0.35 for an exponential rise, and 0.338 for a Gaussian rise.

RC losses: wires have an inherent resistance, and an inherent capacitance when measured with respect to ground. This leads to effects called parasitic capacitance, causing all wires and cables to act as RC lowpass filters.
Skin effect: As frequency increases, electric charges migrate to the edges of wires or cable. This reduces the effective cross-sectional area available for carrying current, increasing resistance and reducing the signal-to-noise ratio. For AWG 24 wire (of the type commonly found in Cat 5e cable), the skin effect frequency becomes dominant over the inherent resistivity of the wire at 100 kHz. At 1 GHz the resistivity has increased to 0.1 ohms/inch.
Termination and ringing: For long wires (wires longer than 1/6 wavelengths can be considered long) must be modeled as transmission lines and take termination into account. Unless this is done, reflected signals will travel back and forth across the wire, positively or negatively interfering with the information-carrying signal.
Wireless Channel Effects: For wireless systems, all of the effects associated with wireless transmission limit the SNR and bandwidth of the received signal, and therefore the maximum number of bits that can be sent.

IC hardware considerations
Computational systems have finite processing power, and can drive finite current. Limited current drive capability can limit the effective signal to noise ratio for high capacitance links.

Large data loads that require processing impose data processing requirements on hardware (such as routers). For example, a gateway router supporting a populated class B subnet, handling 10 × 100 Mbit/s Ethernet channels, must examine 16 bits of address to determine the destination port for each packet. This translates into 81913 packets per second (assuming maximum data payload per packet) with a table of 2^16 addresses this requires the router to be able to perform 5.368 billion lookup operations per second. In a worst-case scenario, where the payloads of each Ethernet packet are reduced to 100 bytes, this number of operations per second jumps to 520 billion. This router would require a multi-teraflop processing core to be able to handle such a load.

 CSMA/CD and CSMA/CA "backoff" waiting time and frame retransmissions after detected collisions. This may occur in Ethernet bus networks and hub networks, as well as in wireless networks.
 Flow control, for example in the Transmission Control Protocol (TCP) protocol, affects the throughput if the bandwidth-delay product is larger than the TCP window, i.e., the buffer size. In that case, the sending computer must wait for acknowledgement of the data packets before it can send more packets.
 TCP congestion avoidance controls the data rate. A so-called "slow start" occurs in the beginning of a file transfer, and after packet drops caused by router congestion or bit errors in for example wireless links.

Multi-user considerations
Ensuring that multiple users can harmoniously share a single communications link requires some kind of equitable sharing of the link. If a bottleneck communication link offering data rate R is shared by "N" active users (with at least one data packet in queue), every user typically achieves a throughput of approximately R/N, if fair queuing best-effort communication is assumed.

 Packet loss due to network congestion. Packets may be dropped in switches and routers when the packet queues are full due to congestion.
 Packet loss due to bit errors.
 Scheduling algorithms in routers and switches. If fair queuing is not provided, users that send large packets will get higher bandwidth. Some users may be prioritized in a weighted fair queuing (WFQ) algorithm if differentiated or guaranteed quality of service (QoS) is provided.
 In some communications systems, such as satellite networks, only a finite number of channels may be available to a given user at a given time. Channels are assigned either through preassignment or through Demand Assigned Multiple Access (DAMA). In these cases, throughput is quantized per channel, and unused capacity on partially utilized channels is lost.

Goodput and overhead

The maximum throughput is often an unreliable measurement of perceived bandwidth, for example the file transmission data rate in bits per seconds. As pointed out above, the achieved throughput is often lower than the maximum throughput. Also, the protocol overhead affects the perceived bandwidth. The throughput is not a well-defined metric when it comes to how to deal with protocol overhead. It is typically measured at a reference point below the network layer and above the physical layer. The most simple definition is the number of bits per second that are physically delivered. A typical example where this definition is practiced is an Ethernet network. In this case, the maximum throughput is the gross bit rate or raw bit rate.

However, in schemes that include forward error correction codes (channel coding), the redundant error code is normally excluded from the throughput. An example in modem communication, where the throughput typically is measured in the interface between the Point-to-Point Protocol (PPP) and the circuit-switched modem connection. In this case, the maximum throughput is often called net bit rate or useful bit rate.

To determine the actual data rate of a network or connection, the "goodput" measurement definition may be used. For example, in file transmission, the "goodput" corresponds to the file size (in bits) divided by the file transmission time. The "goodput" is the amount of useful information that is delivered per second to the application layer protocol. Dropped packets or packet retransmissions, as well as protocol overhead, are excluded. Because of that, the "goodput" is lower than the throughput. Technical factors that affect the difference are presented in the "goodput" article.

Other uses of throughput for data

Integrated circuits
Often, a block in a data flow diagram has a single input and a single output, and operate on discrete packets of information. Examples of such blocks are Fast Fourier Transform modules or binary multipliers. Because the units of throughput are the reciprocal of the unit for propagation delay, which is 'seconds per message' or 'seconds per output', throughput can be used to relate a computational device performing a dedicated function such as an ASIC or embedded processor to a communications channel, simplifying system analysis.

Wireless and cellular networks
In wireless networks or cellular systems, the system spectral efficiency in bit/s/Hz/area unit, bit/s/Hz/site or bit/s/Hz/cell, is the maximum system throughput (aggregate throughput) divided by the analog bandwidth and some measure of the system coverage area.

Over analog channels
Throughput over analog channels is defined entirely by the modulation scheme, the signal-to-noise ratio, and the available bandwidth. Since throughput is normally defined in terms of quantified digital data, the term 'throughput' is not normally used; the term 'bandwidth' is more often used instead.

See also

 BWPing
 Greedy source
 High-throughput computing (HTC)
 Iperf
 Measuring network throughput
 Network traffic measurement
 Performance engineering
 Traffic generation model
 ttcp

References

Further reading
 Rappaport, Theodore S. Wireless Communications, Principles and Practice second edition, Prentice Hall, 2002,  
 Blahut, Richard E. Algebraic Codes for Data Transmission Cambridge University Press, 2004, 
 Li, Harnes, Holte, "Impact of Lossy Links on Performance of Multihop Wireless Networks", IEEE, Proceedings of the 14th International Conference on Computer Communications and Networks, Oct 2005, 303 - 308
 Johnson, Graham, High Speed Digital Design, a Handbook of Black Magic, Prentice Hall, 1973,  
 Roddy, Dennis, Satellite Communications third edition, McGraw-Hill, 2001, 

Network performance
Temporal rates
Information theory